Daniel Bibi Biziwu (born 29 August 2001) is a French rugby union player, currently playing in the prop for Top 14 side Clermont.

Career 
Having started rugby at ES Viry-Châtillon in 2008, Bibi Biziwu played at RC Massy from 2013 to 2018, eventually joining Top 14 side ASM Clermont Auvergne in 2018.

References

External links
 Allrugby.com profile
 

2001 births
Living people
French rugby union players
ASM Clermont Auvergne players
Rugby union props